The Newark Metropolitan Airport Buildings are at Newark Liberty International Airport in Newark, New Jersey. Newark Metropolitan, opened in 1928, was the first major airport in the United States. The trio of Art Deco buildings, the Administration Building, Brewster Hangar and the Medical Building, were built in 1934 and dedicated by Amelia Earhart in 1935. They were added to state and federal registers of historic places in 1980. In 2001, the Administration Building was relocated when a runway was lengthened, and they have subsequently been renovated. The terminal was once adorned with murals by Arshile Gorky, only two of which survive and are part of the Newark Museum collection.

See also
National Register of Historic Places listings in Essex County, New Jersey

References

External links

NPS.gov
NJ Historic Preservation Office

Buildings and structures on the National Register of Historic Places in New Jersey
Transport infrastructure completed in 1934
Buildings and structures in Newark, New Jersey
Art Deco architecture in New Jersey
Historic American Engineering Record in New Jersey
National Register of Historic Places in Newark, New Jersey
New Jersey Register of Historic Places
Transportation buildings and structures in Essex County, New Jersey
Newark Liberty International Airport
1934 establishments in New Jersey
Public art in Newark, New Jersey